The 2011–12 Air Force Falcons men's basketball team represented the Air Force Academy. Led by head coach Jeff Reynolds, who was in his 5th season with the team, was fired on February 8. Dave Pilipovich was named the Interim coach for the rest of the season. They played their home games at the Clune Arena on the Air Force Academy's main campus in Colorado Springs, Colorado and are a member of the Mountain West Conference. They finished the season 13–16, 3–11 in Mountain West play to finish in a tie for last place. They lost in the quarterfinals of the Mountain West Basketball tournament to New Mexico.

Roster

Schedule and results 

|-
!colspan=9| Regular season

|-
!colspan=9| 2012 Mountain West Conference men's basketball tournament

See also 
 2011–12 NCAA Division I men's basketball season
 2011–12 NCAA Division I men's basketball rankings

References 

Air Force
Air Force Falcons men's basketball seasons
Air Force Falcons
Air Force Falcons